The Battle of Pleasant Hill occurred on April 9, 1864 and formed part of the Red River Campaign during the American Civil War when Union forces aimed to occupy the Louisiana state capital, Shreveport.

The battle was essentially a continuation of the Battle of Mansfield, a Confederate victory, which had caused the Union commander, Major General Nathaniel P. Banks, to send his wagons, with most of his artillery, downriver in retreat. However, both sides had been reinforced through the night, and when the Confederate commander, Major General Richard Taylor launched an assault against the Union line, it was repulsed though at a high cost in casualties; the Union army retreated the next day.  The majority of historians consider the battle to be a Union tactical victory, although some consider it to be a draw.

Background
After the success of the Confederates at the Battle of Mansfield, April 8, 1864, Union forces retreated during the night and next morning took up a position on Pleasant Hill. The road from Mansfield to Pleasant Hill was "littered by burning wagons, abandoned knapsacks, arms, and cooking utensils. Federal stragglers and wounded were met by the hundreds and were quickly rounded up and sent to the rear," explains the historian John D. Winters of Louisiana Tech University in his The Civil War in Louisiana.

Confederate reinforcements had arrived late on the April 8—Churchill's Arkansas Division arrived at Mansfield at 3.30 p.m. and Parson's Missouri Division (numbering 2,200 men) arrived at Mansfield at 6 p.m. Neither of these Divisions participated in the Battle of Mansfield — however, both would play a major role during the Battle of Pleasant Hill.

On the morning of the April 9, Franklin ordered the baggage train to proceed to Grand Ecore. It left Pleasant Hill at 11 a.m., and included many pieces of artillery. Most of Franklin's Cavalry (commanded by Brig. Gen. Albert Lindley Lee) and the XIII Corps left with it. This included the Corps D'Afrique commanded by Colonel William H. Dickey (wounded on April 8) and Brig. Gen. Thomas E. G. Ransom's detachment of the XIII Corps, now under the command of Brig. Gen. Robert A. Cameron — Ransom was also wounded on the April 8. The baggage train made slow progress and was still only a few miles from Pleasant Hill when the major fighting began later that day. Brig. Gen. Charles P. Stone, Chief of Staff, and others, attempted to get Cameron to return to Pleasant Hill throughout the day, but he failed to do so — he stated that he never received any written orders to return. Banks doesn't appear to have been fully aware of the exact orders Cameron had received from Franklin.

The Union side lost 18 pieces of artillery at the Battle of Mansfield. These were turned on the Union forces the next day at Pleasant Hill. Confederate Brig. Gen. Jean Jacques Alexandre Alfred Mouton was killed during the Battle of Mansfield, April 8, 1864; Brig. Gen. Camille J. de Polignac commanded Mouton's forces at Pleasant Hill. Confederate Trans-Mississippi Department commander Lt. Gen. Edmund Kirby Smith, who was at Shreveport, received a dispatch from Taylor that reached him at 4 a.m., April 9. It informed him of the Battle of Mansfield. Smith then rode  to Pleasant Hill, but did not reach there in time for the battle — arriving around nightfall.

Among the Union regiments fighting at Pleasant Hill on April 9 was the 47th Pennsylvania Infantry Regiment. Part of the Second Brigade in Emory's XIX Corps, the 47th Pennsylvania was the only regiment from the Keystone State to fight in the Union's 1864 Red River Campaign. Led by Col. Tilghman H. Good, the 47th Pennsylvania sustained a significant number of casualties, including several men who were captured by Confederate troops. Held initially at Pleasant Hill, POWs from the 47th Pennsylvania and other Union regiments were marched and moved by rail to the largest CSA prison west of the Mississippi, Camp Ford, which was situated near Tyler, Texas. Other members of the 47th ended up at Camp Groce near Hempstead, Texas, and/or at the Confederate hospital in Shreveport.

Description of the battlefield

The site of old village is today referred to as the "Old town" or "Old Pleasant Hill". Dr. Harris H. Beecher, Assistant-Surgeon, 114th New York Volunteer Infantry Regiment, present at the battle, described the village of Pleasant Hill as

In 1864, the countryside in this part of Louisiana mostly consisted of pine forests and scrub oaks. According to Banks, 

A newspaper described Pleasant Hill as "a little village situated on a low ridge, containing in peace-times probably 300 inhabitants." It further stated that, 

Historian John Winters describes Pleasant Hill as a "piney-woods summer resort consisting of a dozen or more houses clustered along a cleared knoll, offered Banks many advantages as a battlefield, but because of the great distance from the main supply base at Alexandria and the serious lack of sufficient drinking water for an entire army, Banks could not hold this position for any length of time. During the one day, April 9, most of the rain water stored in the cisterns was depleted. Without making a final decision concerning the future of his campaign, Banks sent his wagon trains . . . on the way toward Grand Ecore. . . . ".

Opposing forces

Battle

According to Maj. Gen. Nathaniel P. Banks' Report of the Battle, 

At 5 p.m., the Confederate forces launched their attack, charging the entire Union line. Walker's and Major's attack on the Union right had little success — the Union right, for the most part, held its ground. However, overall, this initial charge by the Confederates was highly successful and many of the positions down the Union left and center were overrun by Churchill's and Parson's forces and the Union positions were forced backwards. However, the Union side succeeded in halting the advance and regained the left and center ground, before driving the Confederates from the field. The fiercely fought battle lasted about two hours. Losses were heavy on both sides. The 32nd Iowa Infantry sustained especially heavy casualties, as it was cut off from the rest of the Union forces during the battle.

Confederate Brig. Gen. Hamilton P. Bee, with two regiments in columns of four rode swiftly down the Pleasant Hill road toward the enemy lines. The Confederate forces were suddenly attacked at close range by Federals concealed behind a fence.  Winters describes the scene, accordingly: "Men toppled from their saddles, wounded horses screamed in anguish, and for a moment pandemonium reigned. Bee's men took temporary shelter . . . in a series of small ravines studded with young pines until they recovered from the shock of the unexpected attack. Bee rallied his men but in the process had two horses shot from under him. Colonel [Xavier B.] Debray was injured when he fell from the saddle of his dead horse. . . . Debray was able to withdraw his men safely to the rear leaving, however, about a third of them killed or wounded on the front."

Banks and his army began their retreat from Pleasant Hill at 1 a.m. on the morning of the April 10 (just a few hours after the battle had ended).

Aftermath
According to Brig. Gen. Hamilton P. Bee, writing from his headquarters at Pleasant Hill on April 10, 1864, he was in possession of the battlefield of Pleasant Hill at daylight on the morning of April 10 and he wrote that, 

A number of Union soldiers were captured during the battle (and many more at the Battle of Mansfield), and were taken to Camp Ford, a Confederate prisoner-of-war Camp, near Tyler, Texas. Most were kept prisoner here for the next year or so, and were not released until a general exchange of prisoners occurred near the end of the war — a small number, however, were released at an earlier date.

After the Battle of Pleasant Hill, Banks and his Union forces retreated to Grand Ecore and abandoned plans to capture Shreveport, by then the Louisiana state capital. Some of the wounded, perhaps thirty in number from both Pleasant Hill and Mansfield, were taken to Minden for treatment. Those who died of their wounds there were interred without markers in the historic Minden Cemetery. They were finally recognized with markers erected on March 25, 2008 by the Sons of Confederate Veterans.

The historian Ludwell Johnson refers to the battle as a Union tactical victory; the majority of historians agree with this view, although a few consider the action to have been a draw.

The decisive failure of the Red River Campaign was a rare bit of uplifting news for the Confederacy in a bleak year. Despite the loss of resources (including the mercurial and beloved Brig. Gen. Tom Green, who was killed April 12), the failure of this offensive helped to prolong the war by tying down Union resources from other fronts.

Notes

References

Sources
Beecher, Dr. Harris H. Record of the 114th Regiment, N.Y.S.V.: where it went, what it saw, and what it did. Norwich, N.Y.: J.F. Hubbard, Jr., 1866.
Benedict, Henry Marvin. A memorial of Brevet Brigadier General Lewis Benedict, Colonel of 162d Regiment N. Y. V. I., who fell in battle at Pleasant Hill, La., April 9, 1864. Albany, N.Y.: J. Munsell, 82 State Street, 1866.
Greeley, Horace. The American Conflict: A History of the Great Rebellion in the United States of America, 1861–'65. Vols. 1 & 2. Hartford: O.D. Case & Company, 1864 & 1867.
Ingersoll, Lurton Dunham. Iowa and the Rebellion. A History of the Troops furnished by the State of Iowa to the Volunteer Armies of the Union, which conquered the Great Southern Rebellion of 1861–5. Philadelphia: J.B. Lippincott & Co., 1866.
Irwin, Richard Biddle. History of the Nineteenth Army Corps. New York & London: G. P. Putnam's sons, 1892.

 
Pollard, Edward A. The Lost Cause: A New Southern History of the War of the Confederates. New York: E.B. Treat & Co., 1866.
Scott, Bvt. Lt. Col. Robert C. (ed.) & U.S. War Department. The War of the Rebellion: A Compilation of the Official Records of the Union and Confederate Armies. Vol. XXXIV. Part 1 – Reports. Washington: Government Printing Office, 1891.
Stuart, Captain A. A. (17th Iowa Infantry). Iowa Colonels and Regiments: being a History of Iowa Regiments in the War of the Rebellion; and containing a description of the battles in which they have fought. Des Moines, Iowa: Mills & Company, 46 Court Avenue, 1865.
 Venable, R. M., Captain (Chief of Topographical Bureau of Western Louisiana and Arkansas), April 9, 1864 Map of Confederate & Federal Positions
 Winters, John D. The Civil War in Louisiana. Baton Rouge: Louisiana State University Press, 1963, .
 National Park Service battle description
 The Handbook of Texas Online.

April 1864 events
1864 in Louisiana
Pleasant Hill
Pleasant Hill
DeSoto Parish, Louisiana
Pleasant Hill
Sabine Parish, Louisiana
Pleasant Hill